Robert Franklin Williams (February 26, 1925 – October 15, 1996) was an American civil rights leader and author best known for serving as president of the Monroe, North Carolina chapter of the NAACP in the 1950s and into 1961. He succeeded in integrating the local public library and swimming pool in Monroe. At a time of high racial tension and official abuses, Williams promoted armed Black self-defense in the United States. In addition, he helped gain support for gubernatorial pardons in 1959 for two young African-American boys who had received lengthy reformatory sentences in what was known as the Kissing Case of 1958.

Williams obtained a charter from the National Rifle Association and set up a rifle club to defend Black people in Monroe from Ku Klux Klan or other attackers. The local chapter of the NAACP supported Freedom Riders who traveled to Monroe in the summer of 1961 in a test of integrating interstate buses. In August 1961 he and his wife left the United States for several years to avoid kidnapping charges after a white couple got lost in the black part of town in Monroe. The local police and the FBI allegedly convinced the couple to say Williams had kidnapped them, and the FBI put out a warrant for his arrest, causing him to flee to Cuba, and, later, the People's Republic of China. These charges were dropped by the state when his trial opened in 1975 following his return in 1970.

Williams' book Negroes with Guns (1962) has been reprinted many times, most recently in 2013. It details his experience with violent racism and his disagreement with the non-violent wing of the Civil Rights Movement. The text was widely influential; Black Panther Party founder Huey Newton and African American Defense League founder Mauricelm-Lei Millere cited it as a major inspiration.

Early life

Youth
Robert Franklin Williams was born in Monroe, North Carolina on February 26, 1925, to Emma Carter and John L. Williams who worked as a railroad boiler washer. He had two sisters, Lorraine Garlington and Jessie Link, and two brothers, John H. Williams and Edward S. Williams. His grandmother, a former slave of Yoruba ancestry, gave Williams his grandfather's rifle. His grandfather had been a Republican campaigner and publisher of the newspaper The People's Voice during the hard years after Reconstruction in North Carolina. At the age of 11, Williams witnessed the beating and dragging of a black woman by police officer Jesse Helms Sr. Helms Sr., later the Monroe chief of police, was the father of future United States Senator Jesse Helms.

As a young man, Williams joined the Great Migration, traveling north for industrial work during World War II. He witnessed the 1943 Detroit race riot prompted by labor competition between white and black Americans. Drafted in 1944, he served for a year and a half as a private in the then segregated Marines before returning home to Monroe.

Marriage and family
In 1947, Williams married a 16-year-old African American woman named Mabel Ola Robinson, a fellow civil rights activist. They had two children named John C. Williams and Robert F. Williams, Jr.

Civil rights movement

Early NAACP activities
After returning to Monroe in 1955 following his war service in the Marines, Williams joined the local chapter of the National Association for the Advancement of Colored People (NAACP). He wanted to change the segregated town to protect the civil rights of blacks. The chapter had not been very active and was declining in numbers. Williams was elected president and Dr. Albert E. Perry as vice-president; the two generated new energy in the group during the 1950s.

First they worked to integrate the public library. After that success, in 1957 Williams also led efforts to integrate the public swimming pools, which were funded and operated by taxpayer monies. He had followers form picket lines around the pool. The NAACP members organized peaceful demonstrations, but opponents fired on their lines. No one was arrested or punished, although law enforcement officers were present. At that time, Monroe had a large Ku Klux Klan chapter. The press estimated it had 7,500 members, while the city had a total of 12,000 residents.

Black Armed Guard
Alarmed at the threat to civil rights activists, Williams had applied to the National Rifle Association (NRA) for a charter for a local rifle club. He called the Monroe Chapter of the NRA the Black Armed Guard; it was made up of about 50–60 men, including some veterans like him. They were determined to defend the local black community from racist attacks, a goal similar to that of the Deacons for Defense who established chapters in Louisiana, Mississippi and Alabama in 1964–1965.

Newtown was the black residential area of Monroe. In the summer of 1957, there were rumors that the KKK was going to attack the house of Dr. Albert E. Perry, a practicing physician and vice-president of the Monroe NAACP. Williams and his men of the Armed Guard went to Perry's house to defend it, fortifying it with sandbags. When numerous KKK members appeared and shot from their cars, Williams and his followers returned the fire, driving them away.

"After this clash the same city officials who said the Klan had a constitutional right to organize met in an emergency session and passed a city ordinance banning the Klan from Monroe without a special permit from the police chief."

In Negroes with Guns, Williams writes:

[R]acists consider themselves superior beings and are not willing to exchange their superior lives for our inferior ones. They are most vicious and violent when they can practice violence with impunity." He wrote, "It has always been an accepted right of Americans, as the history of our Western states proves, that where the law is unable, or unwilling, to enforce order, the citizens can, and must act in self-defense against lawless violence.

Williams insisted his position was defensive, as opposed to a declaration of war. He relied on numerous black military veterans from the local area, as well as financial support from across the country. In Harlem, particularly, fundraisers were frequently held and proceeds devoted to purchasing arms for Williams and his followers. He called it "armed self-reliance" in the face of white terrorism. Threats against Williams' life and his family became more frequent.

Kissing Case

In 1958 Williams as head of the NAACP chapter defended two young black boys, ages seven and nine, who were jailed and beaten in Monroe after a white girl kissed each of them on the cheek and told her mother, who became enraged. The incident was covered internationally and Williams became known around the world. His publicity campaign, inviting a barrage of headlines castigating Monroe and the US in the global press, was instrumental in shaming the officials involved. Authorities eventually released the boys, who were pardoned by the governor of North Carolina, but the state never apologized for its treatment of them. The controversy was known as the "Kissing Case."

Harassment
On May 12, 1958, the Raleigh Eagle, a North Carolina newspaper, reported that Nationwide Insurance Company was canceling Williams' collision and comprehensive coverage, effective that day. They first canceled all of his automobile insurance, but decided to reinstate his liability and medical payments coverage, enough for Williams to retain his car license. The company said that Williams' affiliation with the NAACP was not a factor; they noted "that rocks had been thrown at his car and home several times by people driving by his home at night. These incidents just forced us to get off the comprehensive and collision portions of his policy."

The Raleigh Eagle reported that Williams had said that six months before, a 50-car Ku Klux Klan caravan had swapped gunfire with a group of blacks outside the home of Dr. Albert E. Perry, vice president of the local NAACP chapter. The article quoted police chief A. A. Maurey as denying part of that story. He said, "I know there was no shooting." He said that he had had several police cars accompanying the KKK caravan to watch for possible law violations. The article quoted Williams: "These things have happened," Williams insisted. "Police try to make it appear that I have been exaggerating and trying to stir up trouble. If police tell me I am in no danger and that they can't confirm these events, why then has my insurance been cancelled?"

The following year, Williams was so incensed with the decision of a Monroe court to acquit two white men of raping a black woman, Mary Reid, that he replied by saying on the courthouse steps:

"We cannot rely on the law. We can get no justice under the present system. If we feel that injustice is done, we must then be prepared to inflict justice on these people. Since the federal government will not bring a halt to lynching, and since the so-called courts lynch our people legally, if it's necessary to stop lynching with lynching, then we must be willing to resort to that method. We must meet violence with violence."James Bock, "A new debate over nonviolence Militant: A fiery black advocate of violence in the 1960s has returned to the spotlight with recent revelations that Thurgood Marshall passed information about him to the FBI," Baltimore Sun, March 2, 1997.Christopher B. Strain, Pure Fire: Self-defense as Activism in the Civil Rights Era, Athens: University of Georgia Press, 2005, p. 59."The Robert Williams Case",The Crisis, Jun-Jul 1959, Vol. 66, no. 6, p. 327-329.

The Harvard Crimson quoted him as saying "the Negro in the South cannot expect justice in the courts. He must convict his attackers on the spot. He must meet violence with violence, lynching with lynching." It is not known where these quotes originated.

Suspension from the NAACP
William's statement on the courthouse steps led to his suspension from the NAACP which claimed that he was advocating violence. Williams disavowed any reference to lynching, rejecting retaliatory force, also called retaliatory violence, claiming he only said that African Americans should act in armed self-defense if attacked by white people.

Freedom Rides and prosecution

Despite losing much support, civil rights activist James Forman was still supportive of Williams and his advocacy for using armed self defense against white oppression. Forman, who would also promote Williams' armed self-defense message during a visit to his home in Monroe, North Carolina, also agreed to assist Williams in organizing a Freedom Ride in Monroe. When CORE dispatched "Freedom Riders" to Monroe to campaign in 1961 for integrated interstate bus travel, the local NAACP chapter served as their base. They were housed in Newtown, the black section of Monroe. Pickets marched daily at the courthouse, put under a variety of restraints by the Monroe police, such as having to stand 15 feet apart. During this campaign, Freedom Riders were beaten by violent crowds in Anniston, Alabama and Birmingham.

Around this time, a white couple belonging to the KKK from a nearby town drove into the black section of Monroe to propagate terror. They were stopped in the street by an angry crowd. For their safety, they were taken to Williams' home.

Williams initially told them that they were free to go, but he soon realized that the crowd would not grant safe passage. He kept the white couple in a house nearby until they were able to safely leave the neighborhood. North Carolina law enforcement accused Williams of having kidnapped the couple. He and his family fled the state with local law enforcement in pursuit.

On August 28, 1961, the FBI issued a warrant in Charlotte, North Carolina, charging Williams with unlawful interstate flight to avoid prosecution for kidnapping. The FBI document lists Williams as a "freelance writer and janitor ... [Williams] ... has previously been diagnosed as a schizophrenic and has advocated and threatened violence ... considered armed and extremely dangerous." After a wanted poster, signed by the director J. Edgar Hoover, was distributed, Williams decided to leave the country.

Exile and return

Cuba

Williams went to Cuba in 1961 by way of Canada and Mexico. He regularly broadcast addresses from Cuba to Southern blacks on "Radio Free Dixie". He established the station with approval of Cuban leader Fidel Castro, along with assistance of the government, and operated it from 1962 to 1965.

During the Cuban Missile Crisis in 1962, Williams used Radio Free Dixie to urge black soldiers in the U.S. armed forces, who were then preparing for a possible invasion of Cuba, to engage in insurrection against the United States.

While you are armed, remember this is your only chance to be free. ... This is your only chance to stop your people from being treated worse than dogs. We'll take care of the front, Joe, but from the back, he'll never know what hit him. You dig?

During this stay, Mabel and Robert Williams published a newspaper, The Crusader. He wrote his book Negroes With Guns while in Cuba.  It had a significant influence on Huey P. Newton, founder of the Black Panthers and in later years Mauricelm-Lei Millere, the founder of African American Defense League. Despite his absence from the United States, in 1964 Williams was elected president of the US-based Revolutionary Action Movement (RAM).

Visit to Hanoi
In 1965 Williams traveled to Hanoi, then the capital of North Vietnam. In a public speech, he advocated armed violence against the United States during the Vietnam War, congratulated China on obtaining its own nuclear weapons (which Williams referred to as "The Freedom Bomb"), and showed his solidarity with the North Vietnamese against the United States military attacks against that country.

Some Communist Party USA members opposed Williams' positions, suggesting they would divide the working class in the U.S. along racial lines.  In a May 18, 1964, letter from Havana to his U.S. lawyer, civil rights attorney Conrad Lynn, Williams wrote:

China

In 1965, Williams and his wife left Cuba to settle in China, where he was well received. They lived comfortably there and he associated with higher functionaries of the Chinese government. In China, Williams continued to publish The Crusader. Represented by the ACLU and human rights lawyer Michael Tigar, he won a lawsuit against the U.S. Postmaster General, in which the statute allowing the U.S. Post Office to refuse to deliver foreign-origin publications deemed to be "communist political propaganda" except at the specific prior request of the addressee was declared unconstitutional under the First Amendment and the Due Process Clause of the Fifth Amendment. In January 1968, Conrad Lynn wrote to encourage Williams to return to the U.S., to which Williams responded:

Disillusionment
Lynn wrote Williams in a letter on January 24, 1968: "You are wise in not making a decision to come back until the financial situation is assured."  Because no financial backing could be found, no 1968 "Williams for President" campaign was ever launched by Williams' supporters in the United States. By November 1969, Williams apparently had become disillusioned with the U.S. left. As his lawyer, Conrad Lynn, noted in a November 7, 1969 letter to W. Haywood Burns of the Legal Defense Foundation:

Williams now clearly takes the position that he has been deserted by the left. How and whether he fits black militant organizations into that category I don't know. Radio Free Europe offered him pay to broadcast for them. So far he has refused. But he has not foreclosed making a deal with the government or the far right. He takes the position that he is entitled to make any maneuver to keep from going to jail for kidnapping ...

Williams was suspected by the Justice Department of wanting to fill the vacuum of influence left after the assassinations of his friends Malcolm X and Martin Luther King Jr. Hoover received reports that blacks looked to Williams as a figure similar to John Brown, the militant abolitionist who attacked a federal facility at Harper's Ferry before the American Civil War. Williams' attempts to contact the U.S. government in order to return were consistently rebuffed.

Return
Williams' wife, Mabel Williams returned first, entering the United States in September 1969. Williams returned via London, England, reaching Detroit, Michigan in 1969. He was immediately arrested for extradition to North Carolina for trial on the kidnapping charge.

Williams was tried in Monroe, North Carolina, in December 1975. The historian Gwendolyn Midlo Hall chaired his defense committee and a broad range of left wing activists arrived to support him. Noted attorney William Kunstler represented Williams in court. The State of North Carolina dropped all charges against him almost immediately.

Death
Williams died at age 71 from Hodgkin's lymphoma on October 15, 1996. He had been living in Baldwin, Michigan. At his funeral, Rosa Parks, an activist known for sparking the bus boycott in Montgomery, Alabama, in 1955, recounted the high regard for Williams by those who joined with Martin Luther King Jr. in the peaceful marches in Alabama. Parks gave the eulogy at Williams' funeral in 1996, praising him for "his courage and for his commitment to freedom". She concluded, "The sacrifices he made, and what he did, should go down in history and never be forgotten."

He was survived by his grandsons Robert F. Williams III and Benjamin P. Williams, and his daughter-in-law, Melanie Williams. His wife, Mabel, lived for 18 more years after his death, dying on April 19, 2014.

Works
Negroes with Guns (with input by his wife; 1962), New York, NY: Marzani & Munsell. Reprinted by Wayne State University Press, 1998.
"USA: The Potential of a Minority Revolution" [1964] 1965. In August Meier et al. (eds), Black Protest Thought in the 20th Century. Indianapolis and New York.
Listen Brother!. 1968; New York, NY: World View Publishers. 40 pp.
"The Black Scholar Interviews: Robert F Williams," The Black Scholar, 1970.
 Williams, Robert F. While God Lay Sleeping: The Autobiography of Robert F. Williams (completed 1996, unpublished).

Sources
"Exile Robert Williams' Wife Returns to US from Africa", The Afro American (Baltimore, Maryland, USA), August 30 or September 6, 1969; p. 22 .
Randolph Boehm and Daniel Lewis, The Black Power Movement, Part 2: The Papers of Robert F Williams, University Publications of America, Bethesda, MD, 2002. The linked-to document is a guide to a microfilmed version of the Robert F Williams Papers, which are at the Bentley Historical Library of the University of Michigan, Ann Arbor. It contains notes on the content of the papers and an introductory essay by Timothy Tyson.
Truman Nelson, People With Strength. The Story of Monroe, N.C., 37 pp. N.Y. Committee to Aid the Monroe Defendants, n.d. (1962 or 1963?). Illustrated wraps. With hand-drawn map.
Assata Shakur's site.
Greg Thomas, "Spooks, Sex & Socio-Diagnostics", Proudflesh, volume 1.1, October 2002 .
Timothy B Tyson, "Robert Franklin Williams: A Warrior For Freedom, 1925-1996", Southern Exposure, Winter 1996.
Timothy B Tyson, "Introduction", to Boehm and Lewis, The Papers of Robert F Williams, 2002, cited above.
Robert F Williams, Listen Brother!, 1968, New York: World View Publishers. Opposes Vietnam War. 40 pages.
Negroes with Guns: Rob Williams and Black Power, a 2004 film

References

Further reading
Hill, Lance. Deacons for Defense: Armed Resistance and the Civil Rights Movement, University of North Carolina Press, 2004. History of the Deacons' civil rights activity and organizing in Louisiana and elsewhere; they supported armed self-defense.
 Forman, James. The Making of Black Revolutionaries, University of Washington Press (1997).
 
 Schaich, Diane Hope. Robert F. Williams: A Rhetoric of Revolution, M.A. Thesis, SUNY Buffalo, 1970.
 Tyson, Timothy B. Radio Free Dixie: Robert F. Williams and the Roots of Black Power. 416 pages. University of North Carolina Press (2001). .
The Robert F. Williams Papers, Bentley Historical Library, University of Michigan, Ann Arbor, Michigan. http://bentley.umich.edu/

External links

General
 Robert Williams Bibliography, African American Involvement in the Vietnam War website.
 Kazembe Balagun, Learning From Rosa Parks, The Indypendent, November 9, 2005.

Writings and interviews
 "Speech by U.S. Negro Leader Robert Williams", at a rally in Peking on August 8, 1966, protesting the discrimination against African Americans in the U.S.
 
 Robert F. Williams, Listen, Brother! (1968), pamphlet addressed to American soldiers in Vietnam
 Sahir, Wanda. "Growing up Revolutionary: An Interview with John Williams, son of Mabel and Robert F. Williams", San Francisco Bay View: National Black Newspaper. May 18, 2005. Retrieved May 23, 2005.
 "Robert Williams's letter to Ambassador Adlai Stevenson", History Is a Weapon.

Film and audio
 
 
 Robert F Williams: Self Respect Self Defense and Self Determination; An Audio Documentary as told by Mabel Williams. Audio CD and 84-page booklet. Produced by Freedom Archives. Distributed by AK Press. Retrieved May 23, 2005.
 BlackAcademics radio interview with Mabel Williams about Robert F. Williams' life
 "Story of Old Monroe", ballad by Pete Seeger

1925 births
1996 deaths
People from Monroe, North Carolina
Military personnel from North Carolina
Writers from North Carolina
Activists for African-American civil rights
American autobiographers
American non-fiction writers
American radio personalities
COINTELPRO targets
American community activists
Deaths from Hodgkin lymphoma
History of civil rights in the United States
American expatriates in China
American expatriates in Cuba
American kidnappers
FBI Ten Most Wanted Fugitives
American gun rights activists
20th-century American writers
People from Lake County, Michigan
American Black separatist activists
United States Marine Corps personnel of World War II
United States Marines
Deaths from cancer in Michigan
20th-century African-American writers